This is a list of viaducts and significant bridges of the United Kingdom's railways, past and present.

See also
List of bridges in the United Kingdom
List of canal aqueducts in the United Kingdom
List of lattice girder bridges in the United Kingdom
List of tunnels in the United Kingdom
List of bridges in Wales
List of bridges and viaducts in Lincolnshire

References

External links
 Forgotten Relics-Bridges and Viaducts

 

Rail
Railway Bridges And Viaducts